Dino Halilović (born 8 February 1998) is a Croatian footballer who plays as a midfielder for Slovenian club Tabor Sežana.

Club career
Born in Zagreb, Halilović started his youth career with the academy of Dinamo Zagreb at the age of 12. Although in March 2014, reports emerged of him joining FC Barcelona B, however he was not selected after a month long trial as the club found him to be physically weak. In early 2016, he joined the academy of Italian club Udinese Calcio. In spite of him linked with Spanish club UD Las Palmas and German club Hamburger SV, he moved to Croatian club Istra 1961 on a two-year contract on 28 June 2017.

On 19 June 2018, Halilović moved to fellow league club Lokomotiva. On 25 January 2019, Halilović was loaned out to NK Rudeš for the rest of the season.

On 16 August 2021, Halilović joined Danish 1st Division club Esbjerg fB on a deal until June 2023. However, on 10 January 2022 Esbjerg confirmed, that they had terminated the contract of Halilović by mutual agreement.

On 12 January 2022, Halilović signed with FC Den Bosch in the Netherlands until the summer of 2023.

International career
Halilović represented the Croatian under-17 team at the 2015 UEFA European Under-17 Championship, where his team reached the quarter-finals. Although he was named in the squad for the 2015 under-17 World Cup, he failed to feature in the competition.

Personal life
His father, Sejad Halilović, is a Bosniak, and his mother, Vanessa, is a Croat. His father is a former Croatian and Bosnian international. Dino has two brothers, Damir and Alen, the latter being a Croatian international who also played for FC Barcelona.

Career statistics

Club

References

External links

1998 births
Living people
Footballers from Zagreb
Croatian people of Bosniak descent
Association football midfielders
Croatian footballers
Croatia youth international footballers
NK Istra 1961 players
NK Lokomotiva Zagreb players
NK Rudeš players
Esbjerg fB players
FC Den Bosch players
NK Tabor Sežana players
Croatian Football League players
Danish 1st Division players
Eerste Divisie players

Croatian expatriate footballers
Croatian expatriate sportspeople in Italy
Croatian expatriate sportspeople in Denmark
Croatian expatriate sportspeople in the Netherlands
Croatian expatriate sportspeople in Slovenia
Expatriate footballers in Italy
Expatriate men's footballers in Denmark
Expatriate footballers in the Netherlands
Expatriate footballers in Slovenia